Epichloë uncinata is a hybrid asexual species in the fungal genus Epichloë. 

A systemic and seed-transmissible grass symbiont first described in 1990, Epichloë uncinata is a natural allopolyploid of Epichloë bromicola and a strain in the Epichloë typhina complex.

Epichloë uncinata is found in Europe, where it has been identified in the grass species Schedonorus pratensis (also called Festuca pratensis or Lolium pratense).

References

uncinata
Fungi described in 1990
Fungi of Europe